Gurankesh-e Jamaat (also Romanized as Gūrānkesh-e Jamā‘at; also known as Gūrān Kesh, and Gūrānkesh-e Vosţá) is a village in Kambel-e Soleyman Rural District, in the Central District of Chabahar County, Sistan and Baluchestan Province, Iran. At the 2006 census, its population was 186, in 40 families.

References 

Populated places in Chabahar County